"Crystal Ball" is the title track and second single released from Styx's Crystal Ball album. It was written by guitarist Tommy Shaw and Jimbo Jones in Montgomery, Alabama. A live version from 1979 was included on the soundtrack for the 1980 film Roadie. The live version is also available on a Japan-only Styx compilation released in 1981 on LP and on CD in 1986.

Personnel
Tommy Shaw - lead vocals, acoustic and electric lead guitar
Dennis DeYoung - keyboards, backing vocals
James Young - electric rhythm guitar, backing vocals
Chuck Panozzo - bass
John Panozzo - drums

References

External links
https://www.discogs.com/release/3561133-Styx-Reppoo-%E7%83%88%E9%A2%A8

1976 songs
1977 singles
Songs written by Tommy Shaw
Styx (band) songs
A&M Records singles